The 1999 Italian Superturismo Championship season was the thirteenth edition of the Italian Superturismo Championship. The season began in Misano on 17 April and finished in Vallelunga on 10 October, after ten rounds. Fabrizio Giovanardi won the championship, driving an Alfa Romeo 156; the Italian manufacturer won the constructors' championship, while Roberto Colciago took the privateers' trophy.

Teams and drivers

Race calendar and results

Championship standings

Drivers' Championship

Manufacturers' Trophy

Privateers' Championship

External links
1999 Drivers List
1999 Standings

Italian Superturismo Championship